Palmiet is a residential area in the north of Durban, KwaZulu-Natal, South Africa.

References

Suburbs of Durban